In Roman mythology, Silvius (also spelled Sylvius) or Silvius Postumus, was either the son of Aeneas and Lavinia or the son of Ascanius.  He succeeded Ascanius as King of Alba Longa and reigned 1139–1110 BC.

According to the former tradition, upon the death of Aeneas, Lavinia is said to have hidden in a forest from the fear that Ascanius would harm the child. He was named after his place of birth, Silva being the Latin word for forest or wood.

According to Dionysius of Halicarnassus, a dispute arose on who should succeed Ascanius, either Silvius (the brother of Ascanius) or Iulus (the son of Ascanius). The dispute was decided in favor of Silvius by the people who believed that it was his right as the grandson of Latinus. Iulus was awarded the priesthood. All the kings of Alba following Silvius bore the name Silvius as their cognomen.

His son, Aeneas Silvius, was also king of Alba Longa. In British mythology, Brutus is considered a  son of Silvius.

Family tree

References

Kings of Alba Longa
Characters in Book VI of the Aeneid